Wakhan is one of the 28 districts of Badakhshan province in eastern Afghanistan. The district has a border with neighboring Tajikistan in the north, Xinjiang in China to the east, and Pakistan to the south (specifically Gilgit-Baltistan and Chitral District).

See also
 Afghanistan–China border
 Wakhan
 Wakhan Corridor

External links
 (Radio Television Afghanistan (RTA Pashto))
 (RTA Dari)

Districts of Badakhshan Province
Wakhan